is a Japanese actress, presenter and former idol. She is a former second generation member of the idol group Hinatazaka46.

Watanabe joined Hiragana Keyakizaka46, now Hinatazaka46, in August 2017 and made her acting debut a month later in the group's drama Re:Mind. She has starred in the television films With You, Who Wanted to Be A Star (2021) and Good Morning, Sleeping Lion (2022). She left Hinatazaka46 in July 2022 to focus on her acting career.

Early life 
Watanabe played basketball from elementary to high school. She was the captain and point guard of her high school team, and participated in prefectural level tournaments.

Career 

On August 15, 2017, Watanabe was introduced as one of nine Hiragana Keyakizaka46 (now Hinatazaka46) second generation members.

In October 2017, Watanabe made her acting debut in the Hiragana Keyakizaka46 drama Re:Mind, aired on TV Tokyo and Netflix, and was the only second generation member to appear in the main story with those of the first generation. She co-starred in the Hinatazaka46 drama Dasada (2020) and appeared in Koeharu! (2021).

Watanabe's first photobook, titled Hidamari and photographed in New Zealand, was released on January 17, 2019. About 17,000 copies were sold in its release week, placing it first in that week's photobook ranking and fifth among all books. It was the first and only solo photobook by a Hiragana Keyakizaka46 member, as subsequent books by other members were released after they were renamed into Hinatazaka46 in February of that year.

In July 2020, Watanabe became a co-host for the basketball program  on NBA Rakuten, the National Basketball Association's web streaming service in Japan.

In January 2021, Watanabe played female lead Nasa Kotosaka in the television drama adaptation of the romance/science fiction novel , alongside Gordon Maeda. The drama was aired on Nippon TV and Hulu Japan, with slightly different storylines for each version. In 2022, she played female lead Remi Watanuki in the action web film Good Morning, Sleeping Lion.

On April 3, 2022, she announced her departure from Hinatazaka46 after the promotion for the group's 7th single "Boku Nanka" has concluded. She would be the first 2nd generation member, and the third after the group renamed, to graduate the group. In that single, she served as the lead singer for the "aggressive, rock-sounding" track "Koishita Sakana wa Sora wo Tobu", and the music video for "Hikōkigumo ga Dekiru Riyū" is about the closing of a dormitory named "Hidamari", a reference to her aforementioned photobook. Her farewell concert took place on June 28 at the Tokyo International Forum, Hall A. The video will be included in Type-A and Type-B of Hinatazaka46's 8th single "Tsuki to Hoshi ga Odoru Midnight". A graduation commemorative book, titled Watashi ga Watashi de aru Tame ni was published by Nikkei BP, which sold 16,000 copies in its release week. She officially graduated from Hinatazaka46 on July 31, with her posting on its official blog for the last time the next day, August 1.

In an interview with Oricon, Watanabe stated that she will continue her entertainment career after graduation, saying that she has garnered some experience in acting.

On September 1, 2022, Watanabe announced her affiliation with the talent agency Queen-B. She also launched her Twitter and Instagram accounts, an official website and her own fanclub.

Discography 

Watanabe had participated in all Hinatazaka46 title songs, as well as the all-member and second generation songs by Hiragana Keyakizaka46 since "Kaze ni Fukarete mo" (2017) and by Hinatazaka46, until "Boku Nanka" (2022). Prominent appearances include:

 "Kirei ni Naritai" (Hashiridasu Shunkan, 2018), as a trio with Nao Kosaka and Akari Nibu
 "Akubi Letter" ("Tteka" B-side, 2021), with Color Chart
 "Koishita Sakana wa Sora wo Tobu" ("Boku Nanka" B-side, 2022), center

Appearances outside Sakamichi Series releases include:

 "Hatsukoi Door" (AKB48 single "Jiwaru Days" B-side, 2019), Sakamichi Series collaboration with AKB48 Group (SakamichiAKB)
 "Hitoribocchi no Kakumei" (Good Morning, Sleeping Lion theme song, 2022), solo song

Videography

Video albums

Filmography

Voice acting

Television drama

Web drama

Variety and talk shows

Music video

Radio

Fashion shows

Tokyo Girls Collection

Bibliography

Notes

References

External links
  
 Queen-B official profile 
  

Hinatazaka46 members
2000 births
Living people
Musicians from Saitama Prefecture
21st-century Japanese actresses